Pierre-Célestin Nkou (8 November 1927 − 16 May 1983) was a Cameroonian Catholic bishop.

Ordained to the priesthood in 1956, Nkou was named bishop of the Diocese of Sangmélima, Cameroon in 1963 and died in 1983 while still in office.

References 

1927 births
1983 deaths
People from Littoral Region (Cameroon)
20th-century Roman Catholic bishops in Cameroon
Roman Catholic bishops of Sangmélima